The  South Sudan People's Defence Forces (SSPDF), formerly the Sudan People's Liberation Army (SPLA), is the army of the Republic of South Sudan. The SPLA was founded as a guerrilla movement against the government of Sudan in 1983 and was a key participant of the Second Sudanese Civil War, led by John Garang. After Garang's death in 2005, Salva Kiir was named the SPLA's new Commander-in-Chief. As of 2010, the SPLA was divided into divisions of 10,000–14,000 soldiers.

Following the Comprehensive Peace Agreement in 2005, the last remaining large and well-equipped militia, the South Sudan Defence Forces (SSDF), under General Paulino Matiep, signed an agreement with Kiir known as the Juba Declaration, which amalgamated the two forces under the SPLA banner.

Following South Sudan's independence in 2011, Kiir became President and the SPLA became the new republic's regular army. In May 2017 there was a restructure and the SPLA took on the name of South Sudan Defence Forces (SSDF), with another change in September 2018 to South Sudan People's Defence Forces. , the army was estimated to have 185,000 soldiers as well as an unknown number of personnel in the small South Sudan Air Force. , the SSPDF comprised the Ground Force, Air Force, Air Defence Forces and Presidential Guard.

History

1983: Inception
On 16th, May 1983 105 Battalion launched a mutiny in Malual-Chaat barrack, Bor against the Sudanese army which later inspired a number of mutinies in the Southern region. and also at Ayod, Pochalla, and Pibor. These mutinies led to the creation of the SPLA.

The Sudan People's Liberation Army was founded in the same year 1983   under the leadership of Commander-in-Chief John Garang de Mabior. Bol was appointed second ranking Commander, and Bany third.  By June 1983, the majority of mutineers had moved to Ethiopia or were on their way. The Ethiopian government's decision to support the emerging SPLA was a means of exacting revenge upon the Sudanese government for its support of Eritrean rebels.

SPLA struggled for a united and secular Sudanese state. Garang said the struggle of the South Sudanese was the same as that of marginalised groups in the north, such as the Nuba and Fur peoples. Until 1985, SPLA directed its public denouncements of the Sudanese government specifically at Sudanese President, Jaafar Nimeiry. During the years that followed, SPLA propaganda denounced the Khartoum government as a family affair that played on sectarian tensions. SPLA denounced the introduction of sharia law in September 1983.

War in the 1980s

In the village of Bilpam, the first full-fledged SPLA battalion graduated in 1984. The name 'Bilpam' carried great symbolic importance for SPLA for years to come, as the epicentre of the uprising. After Bilpam, other SPLA training camps were established at Dimma, Bonga and Panyido.

In the mid-1980s the SPLA armed struggle blocked development projects of the Sudanese government, such as the Bentiu Oil Fields.

SPLA launched its first advance in Equatoria in 1985-1986. During this campaign, SPLA were confronted by a number of pro-government militias. The conduct of SPLA forces was chaotic, with many atrocities against the civilian population. The SPLA drove out around 35,000 Ugandan refugees (who had settled in Equatoria since the early 1980s) back into Uganda.

SPLA had a complicated relationship with Anyanya II. Anyanya II forces blocked the expansion of SPLA between 1984 and 1987, as Anyanya II attacked SPLA recruits heading for Ethiopia. Anyanya II also attacked civilians believed to be SPLA supporters.
The conflict between Anyanya II and SPLA had a political dimension, as Anyanya II sought to build an independent South Sudanese state. SPLA tried to win over the leaders of Anyanya II. The Anyanya II commander Gordon Kong Chuol aligned with SPLA in late 1987. Other sectors of Anyanya II followed his example over the ensuing years, marginalizing the remainder of Anyanya II (allied with the Sudanese government).

Another force that confronted SPLA were the Murahaleen militias in northern Bahr el-Ghazal. Warfare between SPLA and Muraleheen began in 1987. By 1988 SPLA controlled most of the northern Bahr el-Ghazal. Unlike the Anyanya II, the Murahaleen had no political ambitions.

In March 1986, the SPLA kidnapped a Norwegian aid worker of the Christian NGO Kirkens Nødhjelp (Norwegian Church Aid). Moorcroft writes that by this time, 'training, weapons, and discipline improved as the guerillas scored more and more victories. In November 1987 the guerillas captured the small town of Kurmak near the Ethiopian border. It was 450 miles from the capital, but the nearby dam provided most of Khartoum's electricity.' The government showed itself very nervous about containing the SPLA advance.

Political openings
SPLA boycotted the 1986 elections. In half of the constituencies of southern Sudan elections could not be held due to the SPLA boycott.
 In September 1989, the RCC invited different sectors to a 'National Dialogue Conference'. The SPLA refused to attend.

On November 15, 1988, SPLA entered into an alliance with the DUP. The two parties had agreed on the lifting of the state of emergency and abolition of sharia law. The press release was made public through an announcement on Radio SPLA. After DUP rejoined the government, a ceasefire with SPLA was achieved. After the elections, negotiations between SPLA and Sadiq al-Mahdi started, but were aborted after SPLA shot down a civilian airplane, killing 60 people.

With the NIF coup d'état in 1989, all peace talks ended. SPLA launched a major offensive between 1989 and the fall of the Ethiopian Derg government in 1991. It captured various towns, such as Bor, Waat, Maridi, Mundri, Yambio, Kaya, Kajo-Kaji, Nimule, Kapoeta, Torit, Akobo and Nasir. 
By the middle of 1991, SPLA controlled most parts of southern Sudan with the exception of the major garrison towns (Juba, Yei, Malakal and Wau) Between January 21 and 29, 1990, SPLA shelled Juba. SPLA forces also moved into the Nuba Mountains and the southern parts of the Blue Nile State. In comparison with its 1985–1986 offensive in Equatoria, the conduct of SPLA was now more orderly.

1991: Setback and split

But the downfall of the Derg government in Ethiopia in May 1991 caused a major setback. The Ethiopian government had provided the SPLA with military supplies, training facilities and a safe haven for bases for 18 years. Soon after the change of government in Ethiopia, SPLA accompanied hundreds of thousands of refugees back into Sudan.

A split in SPLA had simmered since late 1990, as Lam Akol and Riek Machar began to question Garang's leadership. Akol began secretly contacting SPLA officers to join his side, especially among the Nuer and Shilluk peoples. The situation deteriorated after the fall of the Derg. As the Derg regime crumbled, Akol published a document titled Why Garang Must Go Now. The split was made public on August 28, 1991, in what became known as the Nasir Declaration. The dissidents called for democratization of SPLA, a stop to human rights abuses, and an independent South Sudan (in contrast to the SPLA line of creating a united and secular Sudan). Kong Coul joined the rebellion. The 'SPLA-Nasir' was joined by the SPLA forces in Ayod, Waat, Adok, Abwong, Ler and Akobo. A period of chaos reigned inside SPLA, as it was not clear which units sided with Garang and which with SPLA-Nasir.

Garang issued a statement through the SPLA radio communications system, denouncing the coup. Nine out of eleven (excluding himself) SPLA/M PMHC members sided with Garang. The mainstream SPLA led by Garang was based in Torit. The two SPLA factions fought each other, including attacks on civilians on their opponents' turf.

Battles of 1992
As of 1992 the Sudanese government launched a major offensive against SPLA, which was weakened by the split with SPLA-Nasir. SPLA lost control of Torit (where SPLA was headquartered), Bor, Yirol, Pibor, Pochalla and Kapoeta.

SPLA made two attacks on Juba in June–July 1992, during which they nearly captured the town. After the attacks, the Sudanese government forces committed harsh reprisals against the civilian population. Summary executions of suspected SPLA collaborators were carried out. On September 27, 1992 the deputy commander-in-chief of SPLA, William Nyuon, defected and took a section of fighters with him. SPLA recaptured Bor on November 29, 1991.

Mid-1990s
As of the mid-1990s, the majority of the population of Southern Sudan lived in areas under the control of either the mainstream SPLA or SPLA-Nasir.

2005 Comprehensive Peace Agreement
In 2004, a year before the Comprehensive Peace Agreement, the Coalition to Stop Child Soldiers, estimated that there were between 2,500 and 5,000 children serving in the SPLA.

Following the signing of the CPA, a SPLA reorganisation process began. This process was actively supported by funding from the United States. In 2005, Garang restructured the top leadership of SPLA, with a Chief of General Staff, Lt. Gen. Oyay Deng Ajak, and four Deputy Chiefs of General Staff: Maj. Gen. Salva Mathok Gengdit (Administration), Maj. Gen. Bior Ajang Aswad (Operations), Maj. Gen. James Hoth Mai (Logistics) and Maj. Gen. Obuto Mamur Mete (Political and Moral Orientation).

The initial organisation of the SPLA, based on divisions, was assembled in mid-2005 but not actually put into practice in the field until 2006. It was based on six divisions (in Upper Nile State; 2nd Division: Equatorias; 3rd Division: Northern Bahr el Ghazal and Warrap states; 4th Division Unity State; the 5th Division in Lakes State, the 6th Division, SPLA personnel in the Joint Integrated Units) and four independent brigades. The four independent brigades grouped SPLA forces in Bor (Khoriom, 104, and 105 Battalions mainly), Southern Blue Nile, the Nuba Mountains (South Kordofan) and Raja (Western Bahr el Ghazal).

Probably more important than the reorganisation was the Juba Declaration, signed by Salva and General Paulino Matiep on 8 January 2006. Matiep commanded the South Sudan Defence Forces (SSDF), the largest and best-equipped militia (about 50,000 men) that remained beyond SPLA control. Paulino was appointed Deputy Chief of Staff, the second highest position, his subordinate generals became part of the SPLA without any reduction in rank, and about 50,000 SSDF were added to the SPLA payroll. The number of generals in the SPLA also rose as Salva promoted hundreds of existing SPLA officers to match the arriving ex-SSDF generals. By 2011 and independence, the SPLA had 745 generals. At about the same time, the legislature voted to double infantrymen's base pay from the equivalent of $75 a month (the rate under Khartoum's control) to $150. The unification of the two largest armed groups in the region seriously weakened Khartoum’s control of South Sudan.

In 2007–08 the independent brigades in Blue Nile, Bor, and the Nuba Mountains became the 10th, 8th, and 9th divisions, respectively. The 9th and 10th Divisions thus fell north of the 1-1-56 Independence dividing line between North and South Sudan. The last independent brigade, in Raja, became part of the 5th Division.

Ministry of Defence
In 2007, the SPLM/A established a Ministry of Defence. Gen. Dominic Dim Deng, an SPLA veteran, was chosen as the first Minister for SPLA Affairs and the first political officer of the SPLA. Dim died in a plane crash in 2008 alongside his wife, Josephine Apieu Jenaro Aken, and other SPLA officers. He is buried alongside his wife at the SPLA headquarters in Bilpham, Juba.

Deputy Chief of Staff (Logistics) James Hoth Mai replaced Oyay Deng Ajak as Chief of General Staff in May 2009.

In 2010 U.S. diplomats reported that Samora "made a point to discuss how the SPLA needed to be reorganized. He stated that the SPLA was top heavy, carrying nearly 550 general officers and providing more than 200 security guards for each minister."

The 2005 Comprehensive Peace Agreement stipulated that the SPLA in northern Sudan were to move south of the 1956 North-South boundary during the interim period, excepting those part of the Joint Integrated Units, composed of equal numbers from the SPLA and the Sudanese Armed Forces. Officially, this move did take place, in 2008, with the 10th Division relocating its headquarters to Guffa, five kilometers south of the Blue Nile-Upper Nile border, and most of its troops to al-Fuj, Yafta and Marinja on the southern side. But more than 1,600 fighters remained north of the line. In early June 2011, following the lack of progress on popular consultations in Southern Kordofan & Blue Nile, the SAF attempted to forcefully disarm Nuba SPLA soldiers, and fighting began in Southern Kordofan. After the fighting began, former SPLA 9th and 10th Division fighters proclaimed themselves the Sudan People's Liberation Movement-North (SPLA-N), under Malik Agar as Chairman and Commander-in-Chief.

The Government of Southern Sudan named the SPLA General Headquarters outside Juba 'Bilpam'. The headquarters staff was expanded after 2008 to match the ten-division structure. This expansion coincided with the completion of the General Headquarters at Bilpam, built by DynCorp with funds from the U.S. State Department’s Africa Peacekeeping Program (AFRICAP).

Work on a national security strategy began in late 2012.

Southern Civil War

On December 15, 2013, fighting broke out in Juba between different factions of the armed forces in what the South Sudanese government described as a coup d'état. President Kiir announced that the attempt had been put down the next day, but fighting resumed December 16. Military spokesman Colonel Philip Aguer said that some military installations had been attacked by armed soldiers but that "the army is in full control of Juba." He added that an investigation was under way.

Eventually the Sudan People's Liberation Movement split into two main factions, divided on the issue over leadership of the ruling party:
The Sudan People's Liberation Movement (In Government) was led by President Kiir; it was the ruling faction that signed the Comprehensive Peace Agreement in January 2005. Kiir served as president of the Transitional Autonomous Region of South Sudan from its formation in 2005 after Garang's death until the country's independence in 2011. The SPLM-IO faction formally withdrew from the SPLM ruling faction in 2013.
The Sudan People's Liberation Movement (In Opposition) was formed in 2013 and is led by former South Sudan Vice President Riek Machar. The group is the major opponent to the SPLM-IG faction in the Southern Sudanese civil war.

The coordination of the April–July 2015 attack by the SPLA-IG in Unity State—involving multiple divisions across multiple sectors—indicates a high level of operational planning from Juba. The ferocity with which people were chased into the swamps to be killed was aimed at annihilating the SPLM/A-in-Opposition's support, and led to systematic destruction of villages and towns.

The Tiger Faction New Forces (also called Tiger Faction or 'The Tigers') split from the SPLA in late October 2015. A Shilluk militia, it aimed to reverse the division of South Sudan into 28 (later 32) states in order to restore the territory of the Shilluk Kingdom to its 1956 borders. Led by Yoanis Okiech, the TFNF started an insurgency against the SPLM government. In 2016, however, it also came into conflict with the SPLM-IO rebels, leading to Okiech's death and the group's destruction in January 2017.

Over the course of the war, the SPLA has become dominated by Dinka, in particular Dinka from greater Bahr el-Ghazal. The Panel of Experts wrote in 2016, "While other tribes are represented in SPLA, they are increasingly marginalized, rendering the multi-tribal structure of the army largely a façade that obscures the central role that Dinka now play in virtually all major theatres of the conflict". (S/2016/963, 8)

2017–2018: SSPDF
On May 16, 2017, Kiir  announced a restructure of the army and change of name to the South Sudan Defence Forces (SSDF).

A cessation of hostilities agreement was reached in December 2017, but never really took effect. In August 2017, Kiir announced that the new name for the army would be the South Sudan People's Defence Forces (SSPDF) "by the need to represent the will of the people". He said that there was a need to reorganise and professionalise the army. According to Professor Joel Isabirye, the change of name would shift the discourse from the era of liberation, which had now concluded, to one of national defence, which is ongoing – with the focus on defending the country against external aggression. The insertion of "People’s" into the name "could be to avoid being dragged back into history when during the Second Sudanese Civil War (1983-2005) a militia called South Sudan Defense Forces (SSDF) emerged and aligned with the Government of Sudan".

The negotiations stalled over disagreement among the parties about power sharing, future security arrangements and whether Riak Machar could return from exile to political life in South Sudan. In early May 2018, a two-day meeting of the Parties to the Revitalized Agreement on the Resolution of the Conflict in South Sudan (R-ARCSS) started in Addis Ababa. The parties were to take stock of the progress so far of the R-ARCSS, the pending tasks, and debate the way forward.

The army was officially renamed South Sudan People's Defence Forces in September 2018 by a Republican order read on the state-owned TV channel SSBC known as South Sudan Broadcasting Services ,the national television in South Sudan. The renaming occurred ten days before implementation of new security arrangements, which include the reunification of the national army. President Kiir was also Commander-in-Chief of the army.

As of 2018, the army was estimated to have 185,000 soldiers as well as an unknown number of personnel in the small South Sudan Air Force.

According to the CIA World Factbook , "under the September 2018 peace agreement, all armed groups in South Sudan were to assemble at designated sites where fighters could be either disarmed and demobilized, or integrated into unified military and police forces; the unified forces were then to be retrained and deployed prior to the formation of a national unity government; all fighters were ordered to these sites in July 2019, but as of April 2020 this process had not been completed".

2019
As of 2019, the SSPDF comprised the Ground Force, Air Force, Air Defense Forces, and Presidential Guard.

In October 2019, more than 40 members of South Sudan People’s Defense Forces (SSPDF) undertook two-day training organised by the United Nations Mission in South Sudan (UNMISS) in Kuajok, Gogrial. UNMISS has been in the country since 2011, aiming to consolidate peace and achieve security to allow economic growth and political stability. They were deploying more than 19,000 personnel in the country as of September 2019.

Structure and equipment

The SPLA was commanded by the Chief of General Staff] (COGS). Deputy Chief of Staff (Logistics) James Hoth Mai replaced Oyay Deng Ajak as Chief of General Staff in May 2009. James Hoth Mai was superseded by Paul Malong Awan as COGS in 2014.

After the restructure as SSPDF, Malong was superseded by James Ajongo Mawut (May 2017–April 2018), with the position now referred to as "chief of defence force(s)". On 28 April 2018, Chief of General Staff James Ajongo Mawut died in Cairo from a short illness. He was replaced by General Gabriel Jok Riak on 4 May 2018.

On 11 May 2020 President Kiir removed Riak and appointed General Johnson Juma Okot as Chief of Defence Forces, who had been serving as deputy chief. On 11 April 2021, Okot was replaced by Santino Deng Wol as the chief of Defense Forces.

SPLA structure and equipment
The COGS oversaw five directorates, each led by a Deputy Chief of General Staff (DCOGS):
 Administration
 Operations
 Logistics
 Political and Moral Orientation
 Training and Research

The SPLA had nine divisions and a small air force, all of which reported to the DCOGS, Operations:

1st Division : Renk, Upper Nile State. Established 2006. After the CPA, George Athor was appointed a major general and confirmed in overall commander of Division I (2005–07) before being moved to SPLA HQ in Bilpam as director for administration. The Small Arms Survey wrote in early 2016 that '..[the] Division, stationed in Renk and widely regarded as the best fighting force in the country, is largely Nuer. Until 2 December 2015, it was under the command of Stephen Buay, a Bul Nuer who was subsequently redeployed to lead the SPLA's 4th Division in Rubkona, Unity State.' 
2nd Division : Giada Barracks, Juba, Central Equatoria State Established 2006. By 2013 division headquarters was at Mogiri east of Juba. On 19 August 2011, it was reported that the UN SRSG would visit Kapoeta to meet the County Commissioner and the Commander of Brigade 9 of the SPLA's 2nd Division.
3rd Division : Akuem, Wodyik Lion, Northern Bahr el Ghazal (also covers Warrap State)
4th Division : Mapel, Western Bahr el Ghazal (formerly at Rubkona) Established 2006. Rands wrote in 2010 that "Upon integrating into the SPLA, the core forces of Paulino Matiep, under the command of Tahib Gatluak, [remained] in Mayom County in Unity State. Some were then redeployed to Juba to join Matiep’s bodyguard. The remaining men were deployed as part of the 4th Division in Duar, Unity State." News reports on December 21, 2013 from Bentiu said the 4th Division commander, James Koang Chuol, had declared that he has deposed the caretaker governor and that his forces were no longer loyal to President Salva Kiir. Chuol said he had overthrown Governor Joseph Monytuel after surviving an assassination attempt. Koang said that the 4th Division's tank unit allegedly tried to kill him at around 7pm on Friday upon being ordered by Monytuel at the behest of senior SPLA members in Juba. Significant forces from Division IV defected to the Sudan People's Liberation Movement-in-Opposition, with their arms and ammunition. Division IV was involved in the April–July Unity State offensive by the SPLA, alongside Bul Nuer youth, other SPLA forces, and other armed groups. In 2015-16, the division was placed under the command of Stephen Buay.
5th Division : Girinti Barracks, Wau, Western Bahr el Ghazal State (formerly at Rumbek)
6th Division : Maridi, Western Equatoria. On 13 August 2016, some 800 to 900 troops from SPLA Division VI launched an incursion into the Democratic Republic of the Congo, crossing the border and engaging in a battle with SPLM/A in Opposition.
7th Division : Owachi, Upper Nile State Rands wrote in 2010 that '..[m]uch of the SPLA's 7th Division operating west of the Nile in the Shilluk areas of Upper Nile State is composed of former forces of the SSDF commander Peter Gadet, now a major general in the SPLA. Gadet stayed with SAF Military Intelligence during the Juba Declaration process and many were suspicious of his allegiances. As of the time of writing when Rands wrote, Gadet's authority over his former men in the 7th Division was unclear. Still under command of Peter Gadet in 2013. Significant forces from Division VII defected to the Sudan People's Liberation Movement-in-Opposition, with their arms and ammunition. Gadet died on 15 April 2019.
8th Division : Bor, South Sudan: Formed from SPLA independent Brigades of 105 battalion and Khoriom battalion which all were formed in 1983. The former led the first SPLA rebellion against the Sudanese army Malual-Chaat garrison in Bor that later inspired several other mutinies across the Southern region and some parts of the Northern Sudan. Division 8 is headquartered in Malual-Chaat barrack which is also designated as a liberation museum to commemorate the first SPLA fallen Heroes and the entire history of South Sudan’s Succession from the North. Most outstanding statues are Kerbino Kuanyin Bol’s and Maker Jool Deng (first fallen hero).
Commondo:  Formed after independence of South Sudan under the commands of the late Gen Abraham Jongroor, one of the outstanding Khoriom Battalion commander who successfully fought out Boma militias with commondo. It was the most well trained SPLA brigade  on the front lines, according to the National Military Intelligence.
Mechanized Division : Mapel, Western Bahr el Ghazal State Circa July 15, 2017, the Mechanized Division, with the 8th Infantry Division, was to deploy forces to the Juba-Bor road to ensure the safety of travelers, the SPLA spokesperson announced. The move came after a series of deadly road attack by armed men.
Special Forces brigade with four battalions
The Sudan People's Air Force : Juba, Central Equatoria State

According to a 2015 security agreement with the Sudan People's Liberation Movement-in-Opposition, military forces currently stationed in Juba, Bor and Malakal are to be moved to bases at least 25 kilometers outside of each respective city. The Presidential Guard at Giada Barracks and SPLA's General Headquarters in Bilpam are authorized exceptions to the agreement.

Equipment

As of 2013 the SPLA's land forces operated the following heavy equipment:
110 x T-72
A small number of T-55 tanks
12 x 2S1 Gvozdika
12 x 2S3 Akatsiya
15 x BM-21 Grad
Mamba APC
More than 30 82mm mortars

As of 2013 the South Sudan Air Force operated the following aircraft:
1 x Beechcraft 1900
9 x Mil Mi-17
1 x Mi-172

Defence expenditure

According to the 2013 edition of the International Institute for Strategic Studies' report The Military Balance, South Sudan's defence budgets since 2011 have been as follows:

See also
Democratic Change (South Sudan), formerly Sudan People's Liberation Movement - Democratic Change, a political party
Sudan Liberation Movement/Army, a Sudanese rebel group active in Darfur, founded as the Darfur Liberation Front
Sudan People's Liberation Movement (SPLM), a political party in South Sudan founded as the political wing of the SPLA
Sudan People's Liberation Movement-in-Opposition, a mainly South Sudanese political party that split from the Sudan People's Liberation Movement in 2013
Sudan People's Liberation Movement-North, a political party and militant organisation in the Republic of Sudan

Notes

References

Further reading

Sikainga, Ahmad Alawad, and Daly, M. W., Civil war in the Sudan, London; New York : British Academic Press : Distributed by St. Martinʾs Press in the United States of America and Canada, 1993. (See Douglas and Prunier article on origins of SPLA)
Elizabeth Shackelford, The Dissent Channel: American Diplomacy in a Dishonest Age, PublicAffairs, May 12, 2020. Says that the post-independence South Sudanese army could never be an unified national force—too tribal.
Further reading: African Rights, 1997. Food and Power in Sudan: A Critique of Humanitarianism, London: African Rights. Militarism and brutality of the early SPLA.

External links

Who's who in SPLM-Juba
Photographer's Account of the SPLA - "The Cost of Silence: A Traveling Exhibition"
U.S. Embassy Khartoum, SOUTHERN SUDAN: APPROXIMATE TROOP STRENGTH AND EQUIPMENT INVENTORY of Sudan People's Liberation Army, 06KHARTOUM1650_a, July 12, 2006 15:59 (Wednesday).
	

Factions of the First Congo War
Factions of the Second Congo War
Factions of the Second Sudanese Civil War
Factions of the South Sudanese Civil War
Guerrilla organizations
Rebel groups in Sudan
Rebel groups in South Sudan
Military of South Sudan
Military units and formations established in 1983
1983 establishments in Sudan